The Hefei–Anqing–Jiujiang high-speed railway is a  long high-speed rail line in China, with a maximum speed of . It forms part of the Beijing–Hong Kong (Taipei) corridor. The line takes a similar route to the existing Hefei–Jiujiang railway.

The remaining section from Anqing to Lushan railway station in Jiujiang opened on 30 December 2021.

History
Construction on the Bianyuzhou Yangtze River Bridge, which carries the railway across the Yangtze, began in 2018. It was opened to traffic on December 30, 2021

References

High-speed railway lines in China
Railway lines opened in 2020